"Hold the Heart" is a song by Scottish rock band Big Country, which was released in 1986 as the fourth and final single from their third studio album The Seer. It was written by Stuart Adamson and produced by Robin Millar. "Hold the Heart" reached No. 55 in the UK and remained in the charts for two weeks.

Background
Speaking to Smash Hits in 1986, Adamson said of the song, "It must have been almost a year and a half ago that I wrote it. It was the third song I wrote for the LP. I remember thinking I wanted to write a very ballady song, something that people would never think of as a Big Country song, a very direct boy/girl lost and found song."

Critical reception
On its release, Jane Wilkes of Record Mirror commented, "In the absence of chest thumping, medieval imagery and vomit provoking gallantry, Stuart Adamson and co don't sound too bad. A mellow anthem depicting lost love, that retains its Celtic identity without wallowing in its grossest qualities." Carol Clerk of Melody Maker noted the song's "mellow flow". Tom Demalon of AllMusic recommended the song by labelling it an AMG Pick Track.

In a review of The Seer, Peter Smith of the Tampa Bay Times commented, "'Hold the Heart' is almost a conventional pop love song. The narrator is hopeless and helpless in a grip of a passion that he didn't understand until its source was taken from him." Eric Schafer of the Press & Sun-Bulletin stated: "'Hold the Heart' is one of the most complex and perceptive love songs I've ever heard. In short, this is one of our smartest and most sincere bands. Why then, isn't it huge in the U.S.?"

Track listing
7-inch single
"Hold the Heart" - 5:34
"Honky Tonk Women" (Live) - 3:54

12-inch single
"Hold the Heart" - 6:06
"Honky Tonk Women" (Live) - 3:54
"Hold the Heart" (Instrumental) - 6:06

2x 12-inch single (UK limited edition release)
"Hold the Heart" - 6:06
"Honky Tonk Women" (Live) - 3:54
"The Big Country Interview" (Part One) - 6:18
"The Big Country Interview" (Part Two) - 8:04

Personnel
Big Country
 Stuart Adamson - vocals, guitar
 Bruce Watson - guitar, sitar
 Tony Butler - bass, backing vocals
 Mark Brzezicki - drums, percussion, backing vocals

Production
 Robin Millar - producer of "Hold the Heart"
 Walter Turbitt - additional production and mixing on "Hold the Heart"
 Virgin Vision - recording of "Honky Tonk Women" at the Pier, New York, 1986
 Dave Batchelor - mixing on "Honky Tonk Women"

Charts

References

1986 songs
1986 singles
Mercury Records singles
Big Country songs
Songs written by Stuart Adamson